"2013" is a song by the band Primal Scream. It was released as a single on 25 March 2013 as the first single off of the band's tenth album, More Light. Produced by David Holmes, the title of the song is a nod towards The Stooges' habit of naming tracks after their year of composition ("1969" in The Stooges and "1970" from Fun House). The music video directed by Rei Nadal features scenes of taxidermy, sequin gimp masks, bondage, and psychiatric patients.

Track listing
Digital Download
"2013" - 9:01
"2013 (Andrew Weatherall Remix)" - 8:18
"2013 (Andrew Weatherall Dub)" - 7:47

Personnel

Primal Scream
Bobby Gillespie - lead vocals, percussion, keyboards
Andrew Innes - guitar, keyboards

Additional personnel
Kevin Shields - guitar
Jason Faulkner - bass guitar
Jim Hunt - saxophone
Fred Adams - trumpet
Davy Chegwidden - drums

References

2013 singles
Primal Scream songs
2013 songs
Songs written by Bobby Gillespie
Songs written by Andrew Innes